James Isaac "Preacher" Pilot (January 22, 1941 – January 2, 1991) was an American football player.  He played for the New Mexico State Aggies football team from 1961 to 1963.  He led the country in rushing yardage in both 1961 with 1,278 yards and in 1962 with 1,247 yards. He was the first player since Tom Harmon to lead the country in rushing yardage in consecutive years. He also led the NCAA major colleges in scoring with 138 points (13.8 points per game) in 1961.

Pilot grew up in Kingsville, Texas.  He initially attended the University of Kansas on a basketball scholarship and, after one year, transferred to New Mexico State. He was inducted into the New Mexico State Athletics Hall of Fame. He died in 1991 at age 49 in Fort Wayne, Indiana.

See also
 List of college football yearly rushing leaders
 List of NCAA major college football yearly scoring leaders

References

1941 births
1991 deaths
American football halfbacks
New Mexico State Aggies football players
Players of American football from Texas